The BAFTA Award for Best Casting is one of the annual film awards given by the British Academy of Film and Television Arts since 2020.

In August 2019, the British Academy of Film and Television Arts announced the introduction of the category. BAFTA chair Pippa Harris said in a statement: "We are delighted this year to be including the highly skilled work of casting directors for the first time. Casting is essential to the screen industries, and vital in terms of promoting diversity and inclusion on screen. We hope this Award will also help to promote an understanding of casting".

Winners and nominees

2010s

2020s

Multiple nominations
2 nominations
 Francine Maisler
 Lucy Pardee

References

External links
 

Casting awards
British Academy Film Awards